Acropora batunai is a species of acroporid coral that was described by Carden Wallace in 1997. The species is rated as vulnerable on the IUCN Red List, with a decreasing population, and is extremely fragile. It can be found over a large area but, overall, is not common.

Description
In colour, it is grey, blue, pale brown, and sometimes pink or brown-white. It has long flat branches which contain upright-facing branches and can be arranged in a table-like structure. The radial corallites and axial corallites are combined, small, sharp and tube-like, with the radial corallites are arranged like bottlebrushes. The species is similar to Acropora microclados and Acropora rambleri. It uses its polyps to catch plankton.

Distribution
Acropora batunai is not common and can be found in the Indo-Pacific, in Fiji, Ponape, the Solomon Islands, Papua New Guinea, the Philippines, Malaysia, and Indonesia. It lives in marine habitats in reefs of the central and west Pacific Ocean. It is found in one region of Indonesia, and is incredibly fragile, and is threatened by the global reduction of coral reefs, the increase of temperature causing bleaching, disease, and being prey to the Acanthaster planci. Some specimens occur in Marine Protected Areas. It is listed as a vulnerable species on the IUCN Red List as the population is decreasing, and is listed under Appendix II of CITES.

Taxonomy
The species was first described by Carden Wallace in 1997 as Acropora batunai in Indonesia.

References

Acropora
Cnidarians of the Indian Ocean
Cnidarians of the Pacific Ocean
Fauna of Oceania
Fauna of Southeast Asia
Marine fauna of Asia
Vulnerable animals
Vulnerable fauna of Asia
Vulnerable fauna of Oceania
Animals described in 1997